Paul Thomas Homan (1893–1969) was an American economist, professor of economics at Cornell University from 1929 to 1947.

Early life
Homan was born in Indianola, Iowa.

Homan earned bachelor's degrees from Willamette College, and with a Rhodes Scholarship, the University of Oxford, graduating in 1919. He earned a PhD at the Brookings Institution in 1926.

Career
Homan was instructor in economics at Washington University in St. Louis (1923–25), Assistant Professor of Economics at the University of California, Berkeley (1926–27), Assistant Professor of Economics (1927–29) and Professor (1929-47) at Cornell University.

From 1941 to 1952, he was managing editor of the American Economic Review.

His papers are held at the University of Sussex, England, and were donated in 1969 by his wife, Matilda Etches Homan.

Publications
Contemporary economic thought (1928)

Personal life
In 1950, he married British fashion designer Matilda Etches, her second marriage.

References

Cornell University faculty
1893 births
1969 deaths
Willamette University alumni
Alumni of the University of Oxford
Washington University in St. Louis faculty
University of California, Berkeley College of Letters and Science faculty
People from Indianola, Iowa
Economics journal editors
20th-century American economists
American Rhodes Scholars
Economists from Iowa
American Economic Review editors